The Bennett Brook Railway is a  narrow gauge tourist oriented railway operated by the West Australian Light Railway Preservation Association and is located within the boundaries of Whiteman Park,  from Perth.

History
The Western Australian Light Railway Preservation Association (WALRPA) was formed on 26 April 1976 by a group of rail enthusiasts who shared an interest in less well known railways of Western Australia.

Following the closing of the Lake View and Star Gold Mine in Kalgoorlie in the mid-1970s, four of the founding members purchased the railway's first locomotive - an LV&S 'Planet' Locomotive (which still operates at the railway - the Atlantic Planet). The Planet first was located at a member's property in the Perth Hills, on 17 September 1976.

In 1977, the group proposed to develop a railway at Whiteman Park. Five submissions were received in total, 3 for a  railway, one for a  railway, similar to the railway located at Castledare, and finally a submission to re-locate the Australian Railway Historical Society.

From 1977 to 1982, referred to as the negotiation period, the group also submitted proposals for an operational railway to El Caballo Blanco in Wundowie, The Maylands Peninsula Redevelopment, the former Upper Darling Range Railway (From Kalamunda to Goosberry Hill, and a Mandurah tourist development.

The closure of the Bristile & Wunderlich Brickworks in Belmont saw the donation of a number of hoppers and other rail items.  The railway acquired a locomotive and a number of hoppers from the Maylands Brickworks.

In 1982, development and restoration continued in the Perth Hills, until 16 August, when the WALRPA was advised by Metropolitan Region Planning Authority that their submission for a  railway at Whiteman Park had been successful. On 18 September 1982, the first equipment was placed at Whiteman Park.

In 1983, two former Whiteman Brick locomotives - "Ridley 2" and "Yellow Rose" were acquired.

In June, the C passenger wagons (built on the Maylands Brickworks hoppers) and the Maylands locomotive were moved to Whiteman Park, hauling the first work train on 9 July, and the Planet Locomotive followed on 11 August.

Track laying began on 18 January 1984, and reached "Central" Station on 18 November the same year. Also in 1984, the WALRPA purchased the former Claisebrook railway station to be placed at Central Station (The building arrived in March of that year), acquired a 60 ft Turntable from Midland Workshops, and in March they were notified of their success in a tender for two SAR NG15 steam locomotives (#118 & #123).

8 December 1984 was the official opening of the Bennett Brook Railway, and Peter Dowding MLA (The Patron of the Organisation), with some assistance, drove the first passenger train out of Central Station.

Operations
The railway operates passenger services primarily on weekends, public holidays and school holidays, with some midweek services during school terms.

Held biannually, the railway runs a Friends of Ashley Day (formerly known as Friends of Thomas the Tank Engine), which sees most of the railway's volunteers, locomotives and passenger carriages in operation. This is usually held in May and September which sees the start and end of the railway's steam season.

Enthusiast's days are also held occasionally. They are held in winter so there are no restrictions on steam operations. Most operating engines are involved in interesting freight and passenger trains.

Locomotives 
September to May is fire season, so diesel engines will operate all services.

May to September is steam season, steam engines may operate weekend services when available and diesel engines will operate all other services.

Dates are approximate and are dependent on park conditions and approval.

Large diesel locomotives

Small locomotives

Carriages and wagons

Passenger carriages

Large stock
All fitted with Jones couplers

Small stock
All fitted with link and pin couplers

Freight/industrial wagons
All Wagons are fitted with Jones couplers, unless said otherwise.

For more information, please Visit the BBR Pages

Buildings

At the Bennett Brook Railway, all buildings used on the line (with the exclusion of the yards) are former WAGR/Westrail Station Buildings.

Whiteman Village Junction Station houses the former station buildings from Claisebrook Station (Platform 1/Ticket Office), Subiaco Station (Platform 2/3, Party Room), and Signal cabins from Subiaco and Fremantle (Both are currently not operational). Down at Mussel Pool: The station building is from Nungarin (And was transported to BBR in 1989 with assistance from the Australian Army's 22nd Construction Squadron. There are also two signal Cabins, Collie (No longer operational, now located at parker siding), and Cottesloe, which is fully operational located at the northern end of the Mussel Pool platform.

Signalling and safeworking

Located at Mussel Pool, the Cottesloe Cabin is in place on the Station Platform, and is fully operational. In the Cottesloe Cabin, stands the former Wagin Lever frame, with 15 levers, this frame turned out to be the perfect size for the Mussel Pool Station. 13 of the 15 levers in the frame are used, for 3 sets of points & Locks, and 12 Signals. The cabin is used mostly on weekends during run-arounds at Mussel Pool station, however during large events the cabin is used to assist sorting and preparing trains at the start of the event.

BBR primarily uses the Staff and Ticket System for section authority. The railway is split in 2 sections, and has 2 staffs - Mussel Pool to WVJ (Blue Staff), and the Loop (Red Staff). To travel on a section of line, the driver of a locomotive must be in possession of the relevant Staff. In the case of multiple trains needing to use 1 section of track, the Staff unlocks a box located in the signal cabins at each end of the section, which hold the tickets. A ticket would be filled out and given to the driver of the lead consist, who would also be shown the staff. After the average time to complete the section has passed, the second train can depart the station, proceeding with caution in case the train ahead has broken down, holding both the staff (or another ticket) and a notice of train ahead.

In late 2012 an Electric Staff system was re-introduced on the Mussel Pool to Whiteman Village Junction, with staff instruments located in the signal cabins at both stations. At the same time a wired telephone line was re-introduced between the two stations, using telegraph poles.

BBR has recently completed installation of electric point motors and electrically operated semaphore signals at the north end of Whiteman Village Junction. Work has now started on the installation of searchlight coloured light signals and additional point motors to the south end of Whiteman Village Junction.

Publications of BBR/WALRPA 

 Western Rails (1977-1990)

 Rusty Rails (1982-1994)

 Bennett Brook Railway (2003-) electronic resource
 Swan Valley's Bennett Brook Railway members newsletter (1998-2004) and (2007-2010)

 Shed : the newsletter of the Bennett Brook Railway. (undated one edition 2007 or 2006 ?)

 The Bennett Brook railway worker (2004-2006)

 Bennett Brook Railway newsletter (2011- ?)
 The Bennett Brooklet (2012 ? - present )

External links

References

Tourist attractions in Perth, Western Australia
Heritage railways in Australia
Railway lines in Western Australia
Railway lines opened in 1984
2 ft gauge railways in Australia
Tourist railways in Western Australia
Whiteman Park